Gaurie Pandit Dwivedi (née Pandit; born 1982) is an Indian model and actress who has worked in Bollywood, Telugu and Kannada movies. She made her acting debut as lead actress opposite Gopichand in the 2005 Telugu film Andhrudu. She then appeared in one Bollywood movie and several Telugu and Kannada films.

Early life 
Gowri was born in New Delhi and did her schooling from Springdales, Dhaula Kuan. She then completed her graduation from the Institute of integrated learning in management New Delhi.

From a young age, she aspired to be an actress and trained herself accordingly. At a very early stage, she started getting modeling assignments from some of the Top Brands and agencies of the country. Soon she went on to bag prestigious modeling assignments in Paris and Tokyo before stepping into the world of acting.

Career 
Gowri started her career as a model and appeared in many TV commercials of big brands. One of her most popular ads was the Hero Honda commercial along with Barun Sobti. She then went on to sign her first Telugu film Andhrudu which was a smash hit in the year 2005. Initially, she was not keen about acting in regional films and wanted a career in Bollywood.

She made her Bollywood debut with the 2007 film It's Breaking News. Her next release was multi-starrer Telugu romantic drama film Kasko (2009) directed by G. Nageswara Reddy alongside Vaibhav Reddy and Shweta Basu Prasad. She then starred in films like director G. Ashok’s debut Telugu film Aakasa Ramanna (2010). In the same year, she did her first Kannada movie Jayahe. In the following years, she starred in Telugu films like Nithya Pellikoduku (2011), Rajendra (2011) and Housefull (2012).

Personal life
In 2011 she tied the knot with actor Nikhil Dwivedi who then also turned producer and produced Hindi films such as Veere Di Wedding in 2018 and Dabangg 3 with Salman Khan in 2019. The couple has a son, Shivaan.

Filmography

References

External links

Actresses in Telugu cinema
Female models from Uttar Pradesh
Living people
Actresses in Kannada cinema
Actresses in Hindi cinema
21st-century Indian actresses
Indian film actresses
1982 births